To be included in this list, the place must have an article on Wikipedia or must have inline references showing the name is or was indeed Dutch.

Populated places

Countries
New Holland, AUS
New Holland, BRA
Mauritius
New Zealand
Oranje-Vrijstaat
Zuid-Afrikaansche Republiek
Republic of Utrecht
Kaap de Goede Hoop

Provinces and regions
Arnhem Land, AUS
Baviaanskloof Mega Reserve, Eastern Cape, ZA
Bergen County, New Jersey, USA
Nassau County, NY, USA
Mount Wilhelmina, former name of Puncak Trikora, Indonesia
New Netherland, USA
Nuytsland, Western Australia, AUS
Oranje-Vrijstaat Province, ZA
Overberg (Over 't Berg), Western Cape, ZA
Schuyler County, NY, USA
Schuylkill County, PA, USA
Tasman Peninsula, AUS 
Tasman Region, New Zealand
Transvaal Province, ZA

Islands
Amsterdam Island, Spitsbergen
Amsterdam Island, Southern Indian Ocean
Bear Island, Norway
Bedloe's Island, now Liberty Island, NY-NJ, USA
Block Island, RI, USA
Coney Island, NY, USA
Crocodile Islands, Northern Territory, AUS
Dirk Hartog Island, Western Australia, AUS
Delft, Sri Lanka
Easter Island, CHL
Fishers Island, NY, USA 
Gorée, SEN
Groote Eyland, Northern Territory, AUS
Hermite Islands, CHL 
Hoorn Islands, Wallis and Futuna
Houtman Abrolhos, Western Australia, AUS
Jan Mayen, Norway 
Jost Van Dyke, BVI
Long Island, NY, USA
Manhattan, NY, USA
Maria Island, Tasmania, AUS
Maatsuyker Islands, Tasmania, AUS
New Holland Island, Saint Petersburg, RUS
Ny-Friesland, Spitsbergen
Noten Eylant, NY, USA
Rhode Island, RI, USA
Rikers Island, NY, USA
Robbeneiland, Western Cape, ZA
Roosevelt Island, NY, USA
Rottnest Island, Western Australia, AUS
Schouten Island, Tasmania, AUS
Schouten Islands, former name of Biak Islands, Indonesia 
Sebald Islands 
Spitsbergen, Svalbard, Norway
St Francis Island, South Australia, AUS
St Peter Island, South Australia, AUS
Staten Island, NY, USA
Stateneiland, Argentina
Tasmania, AUS
Three Kings Islands, NZ
Van Diemen's Land, AUS
Vanderlin Island, Northern Territory, AUS
Wakenaam Island, Essequibo River, Guyana
Wessel Islands, Northern Territory, AUS

Castles, Forts & Trade posts
Fort Beversreede, PA, USA
Fort Casimir, DE, USA
Fort Daspoortrand, Pretoria, ZA
Fort Nassau, NY, USA
Fort Nassau, NJ, USA
Fort Hoop, CT, USA
Fort Klapperkop, Pretoria, ZA
Fort Orange, NY, USA
Fort Schanskop, Pretoria, ZA
Fort Wilhelmus, NJ, USA
Fort Wonderboompoort, Pretoria, ZA
Fort Zeelandia, SUR
Kasteel de Goede Hoop, Western Cape, ZA
Kievits Hoek, CT, USA
Peterhof Palace, Saint Petersburg, Russia
Smeerenburg, Svalbard

Cities, towns and neighborhoods

Cities
Amsterdam, MO, USA
Amsterdam, NY, USA
Batavia, former name of Jakarta in Dutch Colonization Era, Indonesia
Batavia, NY, USA
Batavia, IL, USA
Batavia, IA, USA
Blauvelt, NY, USA
Bloemfontein, ZA
Bluefields, NIC
Breda, IA, USA
Brielle, NJ, USA
Dutch Harbor, AK, USA
Groningen, MN, USA
Groningen, SUR
 Grootfontein, Namibia
Harlingen, TX, USA
Hoboken, NJ, USA
Holland, MI, USA
Johannesburg, ZA
Kaapstad, ZA
Lelydorp, SUR
Nassau, BHS
Nederland, CO, USA
Nederland, TX, USA
New Amsterdam, Guyana
New Amsterdam, NY, USA
Oranjestad, Aruba
Pietermaritzburg, ZA
Point-à-Pitre, Guadeloupe
Pretoria, ZA
Rensselaer, NY, USA
Rotterdam, NY, USA
Schenectady, NY, USA
Wiltwyck, NY, USA
Van Buren, AR, USA
Vancouver, Canada
Willemstad, Curaçao
Williamsburg, VA, USA 
 Windhoek, Namibia
Yonkers, NY, USA
Zeeland, MI, USA
Zeeland, ND, USA

Towns
Alkmaar, Mpumalanga
Alkmaar, Suriname
Amersfoort, Mpumalanga
Amsterdam, CA, USA
Amsterdam, NY, USA
Amsterdam, Jefferson County, OH, USA
Amsterdam, Licking County, OH, USA
Amsterdam, PA, USA
Amsterdam, TX, USA
Amsterdam, VA, USA
Amsterdam, MT, USA
Amsterdam, Mpumalanga, South Africa
Amsterdam, Saskatchewan, Canada
Ansnorveldt, Ontario, Canada
Antwerp Township, MI, USA
Barentsburg, Svalbard, Norway 
Batavia Township, MI, USA
Batavia, NY, USA
Batavia, OH, USA
Batavia, WI, USA
Beterverwagting, Guyana
Beukendaal, NY, USA
Bloubergstrand, Western Cape, South Africa
Bluefields, Jamaica
The Bottom, Saba
Bredasdorp, Western Cape, South Africa
Claverack, NY, USA
Coeymans, NY, USA
Delft, MN, USA
Town of DeRuyter, NY, USA
Village of DeRuyter, NY, USA
Deventer, MO, USA
Domburg, Suriname
Dordrecht, Eastern Cape, South Africa
Drakenstein, Western Cape, South Africa
Edam, Saskatchewan, Canada
Ermelo, Mpumalanga, South Africa
Esau and Jacob, Guyana
Flushing, Cornwall, UK
Franschhoek, Western Cape, South Africa
Graaff-Reinet, Eastern Cape, South Africa
Greenbush (North and East), NY, USA
Groningen, Suriname
Groote Laagte, Botswana
Guilderland, NY, USA
Haarlem, Western Cape, South Africa
Hague, ND, USA
Hague, NY, USA
Harlem, OH, USA
Haverstraw, NY, USA
Hempstead, NY, USA
Hermanus, Western Cape, South Africa
Holambra, Brazil
Holland, Manitoba, Canada
Holland Township, MI, USA
Holland Charter Township, MI, USA 
Holland, NY, USA
Holland, Arkansas, USA
Holland, OH, USA
Holland, WI, USA
Holland Landing, Ontario, CAN
Town of Kinderhook, NY, USA
Village of Kinderhook, NY, USA
Klerksdorp, North West, South Africa
Leyden, MA, USA
Leyden, NY, USA
Leyden, WI, USA
Lichtenburg, North West, South Africa
Lincklaen, NY, USA
Lydenburg, Mpumalanga, South Africa 
Meten-Meer-Zorg, Guyana
Middelburg, Eastern Cape, South Africa
Middelburg, Mpumalanga, South Africa
Middleburgh, NY, USA
Morgenzon, Mpumalanga, South Africa
Muizenberg, Western Cape, South Africa
Nassau, NY, USA
Nederland, CO, USA
New Almelo, KS, USA
Nieuw Amsterdam, Suriname
Nieuw Rotterdam, Suriname
Nooitgedacht, Transvaal, South Africa
Oostburg, WI, USA
Oranjestad, Aruba
Oranjestad, Sint Eustatius
Overisel Township, MI, USA
Paarl, Western Cape, South Africa
Pella, IA, USA
Petergof, Saint Petersburg, Russia
Philipsburg, Sint Maarten
Plattekill, NY, USA
Pniel, Western Cape, South Africa
Poestenkill, NY, USA
Potchefstroom, North West, South Africa
Rodebay, Western Greenland
Rosendale, NY, USA
Rotterdam, NY, USA
Saugerties, NY, USA
South Holland, IL, USA
Stabroek, Guyana
Stellenbosch, Western Cape, South Africa
 Struizendam, Botswana
Stuyvesant, NY, USA
Swellendam, Western Cape, South Africa
Uitvlugt, Guyana
Utrecht, KwaZulu-Natal, South Africa
Vaalhoek, Botswana
Valatie, NY, USA
Vereeniging, Gauteng, South Africa
Venlo, North Dakota, USA
Volksrust, Mpumulanga, South Africa
Vreed en Hoop, Guyana
Vryheid, KwaZulu-Natal, South Africa
Wageningen, Suriname
Watervliet, NY, USA
Weenen, KwaZulu-Natal, South Africa
Wel te Vreeden, Guyana
Weldaad, Guyana
Wilhelmina, MO, USA
Wynantskill, NY, USA
Zeeburg, Guyana
Zeehan, Tasmania, Australia
Zeeland Charter Township, MI, USA
Zeelandia, Guyana
Zeerust, North West, South Africa
Zwaanendael, DE, USA
Zwolle, LA, USA

Neighbourhoods
Bedford–Stuyvesant, NYC, NY, USA
Bergen, Jersey City, NJ, USA
Beverwyck, Albany, NY, USA
Bloemendhal, Colombo, Sri Lanka
Boerum Hill, NYC, NY, USA
Bowery, NYC, NY, USA
Broadway, NYC, NY, USA
Brielle, Wall, NJ, USA
The Bronx, NYC, NY, USA
Brooklyn, NYC, NY, USA
Bushwick, NYC, NY, USA
Cobble Hill, NYC, NY, USA
Constable Hook, Bayonne, NJ USA
Dunderhook Paramus, NJ, USA
Delft, Western Province, ZA
Dutch Kills, NYC, NY, USA
Dutch Quarter, Colchester, Essex, England
Dutch Quarter, Potsdam, Brandenburg, Germany
Dyker Heights, NYC, NY, USA
Flushing, NYC, NY, USA
Gerritsen Beach, NYC, NY, USA
Gowanus, NYC, NY, USA
Gravesend, NYC, NY, USA
Greenwich Village, NYC, NY, USA
Harlem, NYC, NY, USA
Hultsdorf, Colombo, Sri Lanka
Kips Bay, NYC, NY, USA
Maspeth, Queens, NYC, NY, USA
Mauritsstad, Recife, Brazil
Muitzes Kill, Schodack, NY, USA
New Dorp, NYC, NY, USA
New Utrecht, NYC, NY, USA
Oranjezicht, Western Cape, ZA
Paulus Hook, Jersey City, NJ, USA
Prospect Lefferts Gardens, NYC, NY, USA
Rotterdam, Schenectady, NY, USA
Spuyten Duyvil, NYC, NY, USA
Stabroek, Georgetown, Guyana
Stuyvesant Heights, NYC, NY, USA
Todt Hill, NYC, NY, USA
Van Cortlandt Village, NYC, NY, USA
Van Nest, NYC, NY, USA
Wall Street, NYC, NY, USA

Other

Bays
Barnegat Bay, NJ, USA
Valsbaai, Western Cape, ZA
Gansbaai, Western Cape, ZA
Storm Bay, Tasmania, AUS
Tafelbaai, Western Cape, ZA
Tasman Bay / Te Tai-o-Aorere, New Zealand
Vansittart Bay, Western Australia, AUS
Wilhelmina Bay, Antarctica

Beaches
Wingaersheek Beach

Capes
Cape of Good Hope, Western Cape, ZA
Cape Henlopen, DE, USA
Cape Horn, CHL
Cape Keerweer, Queensland, AUS
Cape Leeuwin, Western Australia, AUS
Cape Maria van Diemen, NZ
Cape May, NJ, USA
Cape Patience, Sakhalin, RUS
Sandy Hook, NJ, USA
Verlegenhuken, Spitsbergen

Gulfs
Frederick Henry Bay, Tasmania, AUS 
Geelvink Channel, Western Australia, AUS
Gulf of Carpentaria, AUS
Gulf of Patience, RUS
Liefdefjorden, Spitsbergen
Storm Bay, Tasmania, AUS
Van Diemen Gulf, AUS
Wijdefjorden, Spitsbergen

Lakes
Beira Lake, Sri Lanka (see Sri Lankan place name etymology#Dutch)
Harlem Meer, NY, USA

Mountains
Bakhuis Mountains, Suriname
Carstensz Pyramid, Papua, Indonesia
Carstensz Glacier, Puncak Jaya, Papua, Indonesia
Drakensberg, South Africa
Eilerts de Haan Mountains, Suriname
Hottentots-Holland Mountain Range, Western Cape, South Africa
Juliana Peak, former name of Puncak Mandala, Papua, Indonesia
Julianatop, Suriname
Lely Mountains, Suriname
Mount Wilhelmina, former name of Puncak Trikora, Papua, Indonesia
Table Mountain (Tafelberg), South Africa
Van Asch Van Wijck Mountains, Suriname
Wilhelmina Mountains, Suriname

Rivers
Big Timber Creek, NJ, USA
Coen River, Queensland, AUS
Hell Gate, NY, USA
Holland River, Ontario, CAN
Orange River, ZA
South River, NY, USA
Lorentz River, Papua, Indonesia
Poesten Kill, NY, USA
Staaten River, AUS
Swan River, Western Australia, AUS
Schuylkill River, PA, USA
Staaten River, Queensland, AUS
Tasman River, New Zealand
Vaal River, ZA
Wynants Kill, NY, USA

Seas
Barents Sea, Arctic
North Sea, Western Europe
Tasman Sea, AUS
Wadden Sea, Western Europe

Straits
Arthur Kill, NY, USA
East River, NY, USA
Hinlopen Strait, Spitsbergen
Le Maire Strait, Argentina
Kattegat, Denmark
Kill Van Kull, NY, USA
Vries Strait, Kuril Islands, Russia/Japan

Note
Country codes used for this article
US state codes used for this article

See also
List of place names of Dutch origin in Australia
List of place names of Dutch origin in the United States
Toponymy of New Netherland
Early modern Netherlandish cartography

References

Toponymy
place
Dutch language lists
Maritime history of the Dutch Republic
Dutch Empire